Big Hole National Forest was established as the Big Hole Forest Reserve by the U.S. Forest Service in Montana and Idaho on November 5, 1906  with .  It became a National Forest on March 4, 1907. On July 1, 1908 Big Hole was divided between Beaverhead, Deerlodge and Bitterroot National Forests and the name was discontinued.

See also
 List of forests in Montana

References

External links
Forest History Society
Forest History Society:Listing of the National Forests of the United States Text from Davis, Richard C., ed. Encyclopedia of American Forest and Conservation History. New York: Macmillan Publishing Company for the Forest History Society, 1983. Vol. II, pp. 743-788.

Former National Forests of Montana
1906 establishments in Montana